The 2021 Curlers Corner Autumn Gold Curling Classic was held from October 8 to 11 at the Calgary Curling Club in Calgary, Alberta. The event was held in a triple-knockout format with a purse of $44,000.

After dropping into the C Event, the United States' Team Tabitha Peterson won five straight sudden death games to claim the title. In the final, they defeated Japan's Satsuki Fujisawa 7–5.

Teams
The teams are listed as follows:

Knockout brackets

Source:

A event

B event

C event

Knockout results
All draw times listed in Mountain Daylight Time (UTC-06:00).

Draw 1
Friday, October 8, 9:30 am

Draw 2
Friday, October 8, 1:15 pm

Draw 3
Friday, October 8, 5:15 pm

Draw 4
Friday, October 8, 9:00 pm

Draw 5
Saturday, October 9, 9:00 am

Draw 6
Saturday, October 9, 12:45 pm

Draw 7
Saturday, October 9, 4:30 pm

Draw 8
Saturday, October 9, 8:15 pm

Draw 9
Sunday, October 10, 9:00 am

Draw 10
Sunday, October 10, 12:45 pm

Draw 11
Sunday, October 10, 4:30 pm

Draw 12
Sunday, October 10, 8:15 pm

Playoffs

Source:

Quarterfinals
Monday, October 11, 9:00 am

Semifinals
Monday, October 11, 12:15 pm

Final
Monday, October 11, 3:30 pm

Notes

References

External links
Official Website
CurlingZone

Autumn Gold Curling Classic
2021 in Canadian curling
2021 in Alberta
October 2021 sports events in Canada
2021 in women's curling
2020s in Calgary